Gunter Faure is a geochemist who currently holds the position of Professor Emeritus in the School of Earth Science of Ohio State University. He obtained his PhD from the Massachusetts Institute of Technology in 1961.

Books
Introduction to Planetary Science: The Geological Perspective, Gunter Faure and Teresa M. Mensing, Springer, 2007, 526 pp. 
Isotopes: Principles and Applications, Gunter Faure and Teresa M. Mensing, Wiley; 3rd edition, 2005.
Origin of Igneous Rocks: The Isotopic Evidence, Gunter Faure, Springer, 2000, 496 pp.  (2010 reprint )
Principles and Applications of Geochemistry, Gunter Faure, Prentice Hall, 1998, 2nd Ed., 625 pp. 
Principles and Applications of Inorganic Geochemistry, Gunter Faure, Macmillan, 1991, 500pp. 
The Transantarctic Mountains: Rocks, Ice, Meteorites and Water, Gunter Faure and Teresa M. Mensing, Springer, 2010, 804 pp.

References

American geochemists
Living people
Year of birth missing (living people)